Gabrielle Villiger (born 7 June 1971) is a Swiss former professional tennis player. She played college tennis for Anderson College in South Carolina.

Villiger, the younger sister of Federation Cup player Isabelle, represented Switzerland in two ties herself in 1989. She teamed up with Céline Cohen to win a doubles rubber against Belgium and then featured in the opening singles rubber against Indonesia, which she lost to Suzanna Wibowo.

ITF finals

Singles: 1 (0–1)

See also
List of Switzerland Fed Cup team representatives

References

External links
 
 
 

1971 births
Living people
Swiss female tennis players